Vladimir Niyonkuru (born 21 July 1983 in Bujumbura) is a Burundian goalkeeper with Azzam United in the Tanzanian Premier League in Tanzania.

Career
He signs on 1 January 2006 with Rayon Sport, he came from AS Inter Star an Bujumbura based club on youth side played for Vital'O F.C.

International career
Niyonkuru is member of the Burundi national football team.

References

External links

 Niyonkuru profile in Azzam Official Website

1983 births
Living people
Sportspeople from Bujumbura
Burundian footballers
Association football goalkeepers
Burundi international footballers
Burundian expatriate footballers
Expatriate footballers in Rwanda
Expatriate footballers in Tanzania
Burundian expatriate sportspeople in Rwanda
Burundian expatriate sportspeople in Tanzania
Rayon Sports F.C. players